Jessica Taylor  is a British feminist author and campaigner. Taylor is the author of the 2020 book Why Women Are Blamed For Everything. She has made appearances on British television, including BBC Two documentary Womanhood, and in the true crime documentary My Lover, My Killer, which aired on Channel Five.

Early life
Taylor grew up in a council estate in Stoke-on-Trent. She said that she was repeatedly sexually and physically abused as a teenager by men in her town, which she kept hidden from her family. As the result of her repeated rapes, Taylor gave birth to her first child at the age of 17 and reported her abuse to the police.

Career
Taylor began volunteering with domestic violence victims before deciding to earn her Bachelor of Science Hons degree in psychology from the Open University. Upon receiving her degree, Taylor co-founded The Eaton Foundation, a Male Mental Health and Wellbeing Centre in the UK, with Alex Eaton. She eventually quit her job and founded VictimFocus, which she describes as "a company designed to challenge and change the victim blaming practices in social care, policing, mental health and support services all over the world." In 2017 and 2018, she was shortlisted for the Emma Humphreys Memorial Prize.

In 2019, Taylor completed her PhD in forensic psychology from the University of Birmingham with a thesis titled ‘Logically, I know I’m not to blame but I still feel to blame’: exploring and measuring victim blaming and self-blame of women who have been subjected to sexual violence. While working towards her doctoral degree, Taylor was appointed to Chair of the Parliamentary Conference on Violence Against Women and Girls. Upon finishing her doctoral research, Taylor became a Senior Lecturer in Criminal and Forensic Psychology at the University of Derby. She was later recognized for her "contribution to the psychology of victim blaming of women, her work in mental health and her contribution to feminism" by the Royal Society of Arts.

In 2020, Taylor self-published her thesis as a book titled Why Women are Blamed for Everything. Based on three years of doctoral research and 10 years of practice with women and girls, the book focuses on the reasons why society and individual psychology blames women for male violence committed against them. It draws on the psychometric measure Taylor developed during her doctoral research–called the BOWSVA scale–which measures the way the general public and professionals apportion blame to women and girls who have been subjected to sexual violence. The book also includes interviews with women who have been blamed for sexual assaults and professionals working in sexual violence services who are attempting to deconstruct victim blaming.

Upon the book’s release, Taylor was the target of coordinated attacks and harassment by alt-right trolls on Facebook and Twitter, and her personal computer was hacked. Why Women are Blamed for Everything sold 10,000 copies in its first two months before being bought by the publishing company Constable.

In 2022, Taylor published her second book, Sexy But Psycho: Uncovering the Labelling of Women and Girls through Constable. She described it as ”mixture of academic research, history, psychology and real-life stories of women and girls who have been told that they are mentally ill, instead of being listened to”. The book focuses on how mental illness has historically been used to discredit women, focusing especially on the 2000s and pop artist Britney Spears.

During the Depp v. Heard case, Taylor said that borderline personality disorder and histrionic personality disorder are "not proven medical conditions" but are instead "highly contested controversial psychiatric labels". On her website, she professed that the former is known in psychology and psychiatry as a "junk diagnosis", and the latter as a "debunked disorder".

Publications
The Little Orange Book: Learning about abuse from the voice of the child (2018)
Detoxing Taylor (2011, as Jessica Eaton)
Why Women are Blamed for Everything: Exploring Victim Blaming of Women Subjected to Abuse and Trauma (2020)
'I thought it was just a part of life' Understanding the Scale of Violence Committed Against Women in the UK Since Birth (2021)
Sexy But Psycho: Uncovering the Labelling of Women and Girls (2022)

References

Living people
Alumni of the University of Birmingham
Alumni of the Open University
Academics of the University of Derby
21st-century British women writers
British women bloggers
Sexual abuse victim advocates
Feminist studies scholars
British feminist writers
Feminist psychologists
Year of birth missing (living people)